Birinci Ağalı (also, Agaly, Agaly Pervyye, and Yukhary Agaly) is a village in the Zangilan Rayon, located in the south-west of the country of Azerbaijan. It was occupied by the Armenian forces in 1993. The Army of Azerbaijan recaptured the village on or around October 28, 2020.

References 

Populated places in Zangilan District